Gone, Gone, Gone may refer to:
Gone Gone Gone (album), a 1964 album by The Everly Brothers, or the title track
"Gone, Gone, Gone" (Phillip Phillips song), 2013
"Gone, Gone, Gone" (Bad Company song), 1979
"Gone, Gone, Gone", song by Echo & the Bunnymen from their 1990 album Reverberation
"Gone, Gone, Gone" (True Blood), an episode of the American TV series True Blood
"Gone, Gone, Gone", song by Collins & Harlan, 1904

See also
"She's Gone, Gone, Gone", a 1965 single by American country music artist Lefty Frizzell